The first cabinet of Lascăr Catargiu was the government of Romania from 11 May to 13 July 1866.

Ministers
The ministers of the cabinet were as follows:

President of the Council of Ministers:
Lascăr Catargiu (11 May - 13 July 1866)
Minister of the Interior: 
Lascăr Catargiu (11 May - 13 July 1866)
Minister of Foreign Affairs: 
Petre Mavrogheni (11 May - 13 July 1866)
Minister of Finance:
Ion C. Brătianu (11 May - 13 July 1866)
Minister of Justice:
Ion C. Cantacuzino (11 May - 13 July 1866)
Minister of War:
Gen. Ioan Gr. Ghica (11 May - 13 July 1866)
Minister of Religious Affairs and Public Instruction:
Constantin A. Rosetti (11 May - 13 July 1866)
Minister of Public Works:
Dimitrie A. Sturdza (11 May - 13 July 1866)

References

Cabinets of Romania
Cabinets established in 1866
Cabinets disestablished in 1866
1866 establishments in Romania
1866 disestablishments in Romania